El Tiempo is a Honduran daily newspaper owned by Jaime Rosenthal. 

On August 31, 2000, the internet domain www.tiempo.hn was purchased by  Banco Continental with a 15-year right of possession. 

On July 19, 2019, the site www.tiempo.hn  ranked eighth in Honduras.

El Tiempo had previous published the Honduras Top 50 music chart in the country. Chart rankings were based on radio play and surveyed through radio stations in San Pedro Sula, Tegucigalpa, La Ceiba, Puerto Cortés, Choluteca and Roaton.

References

External links
 Official site

Newspapers published in Honduras
Spanish-language newspapers
Mass media in San Pedro Sula